Palmview is a city in Hidalgo County, Texas. The population is 17,410 as of the 2020 United States Census. It is part of the McAllen–Edinburg–Mission and Reynosa–McAllen metropolitan areas.

Geography
Palmview is in southwestern Hidalgo County, to the west of Mission. Interstate 2 passes through the city as a freeway, leading east  to McAllen and west  to Rio Grande City.

Demographics

2020 census

As of the 2020 United States census, there were 15,830 people, 5,079 households, and 4,261 families residing in the city.

2000 census
As of the census of 2000, there were 4,107 people, 1,093 households, and 977 families residing in the city. The population density was 1,712.5 people per square mile (660.7/km). There were 1,671 housing units at an average density of 696.7 per square mile (268.8/km). The racial makeup of the city was 67.35% White, 0.02% Black, 0.12% Native American, 0.12% Asian, 31.19% from other races, and 1.19% from two or more races. Hispanic or Latino of any race were 93.21% of the population.

There were 1,093 households, out of which 57.7% had children under the age of 18 living with them, 73.8% were married couples living together, 12.0% had a female householder with no husband present, and 10.6% were non-families. 9.2% of all households were made up of individuals, and 4.8% had someone living alone who was 65 years of age or older. The average household size was 3.76 and the average family size was 4.01.

In the city, the population was spread out, with 37.2% under the age of 18, 12.0% from 18 to 24, 29.0% from 25 to 44, 13.5% from 45 to 64, and 8.3% who were 65 years of age or older. The median age was 26 years. For every 100 females, there were 96.5 males. For every 100 females age 18 and over, there were 89.0 males.

The median income for a household in the city was $35,684, and the median income for a family was $33,953. Males had a median income of $27,884 versus $23,577 for females. The per capita income for the city was $11,585. About 25.2% of families and 30.3% of the population were below the poverty line, including 35.1% of those under age 18 and 11.1% of those age 65 or over.

Education
Palmview is served by the La Joya Independent School District. Zoned schools include:
 Elementary: Enrique Camarena, Guillermo Flores, Henry B. González, Leo J. Leo, and E. B. Reyna
 Middle: C. Chavez, Irene Garcia, Memorial, and A. Richards
 Palmview High School and La Joya High School

In addition, South Texas Independent School District and IDEA Public Schools (Charter) operates magnet schools that serve the community.

Commute
The average commute time to work in the city of Palmview is 18.4 mins. The average car ownership in Palmview is 2.2 vehicles per family.

References

External links
City of Palmview official website

Cities in Hidalgo County, Texas
Cities in Texas